Southorpe  is a civil parish in the city of Peterborough, Cambridgeshire, England. Southorpe may also refer to:

Southorpe, Lincolnshire
Southorpe, East Riding of Yorkshire, deserted medieval village